Jean Leymarie may refer to:
Jean Leymarie (journalist), French radio journalist
Jean Leymarie (art historian) (1919–2006), French art historian